Sunsets & Sushi: Experiments in Spectral Deconstruction is David Crowder Band's first studio EP. It contains remixes of eight songs from their 2003 release Illuminate.

Track listing
 "No One Like You (Thanksgiving Mix)"
 "O Praise Him (All This for a King) (Oceanic Mix)"
 "Open Skies (Dirty Beats Mix)"
 "Revolutionary Love (Neo-mechanical Mix)"
 "How Great (Direct from Satellite City)"
 "Intoxicating (Pneumatic Mix)"
 "Deliver Me (Antidromic Mix)"
 "Stars (From the Mount Wilson Observatory)"

David Crowder Band albums
2005 debut EPs